Sweden Fork is a  long 2nd order tributary to Sandy Creek in Pittsylvania County, Virginia.

Course 
Sweden Fork rises in a pond about 1 mile northwest of Chestnut Level, Virginia in Pittsylvania County and then flows generally east to join Sandy Creek about 1 mile northeast of Dodson Corners.

Watershed 
Sweden Fork drains  of area, receives about 45.6 in/year of precipitation, has a wetness index of 381.67, and is about 44% forested.

See also 
 List of Virginia Rivers

References 

Rivers of Pittsylvania County, Virginia
Rivers of Virginia